The   or simply Okuda Incident occurred in Japan at 8:32 AM on September 26, 2002, between Okuda Station and Ōsato Station on the Meitetsu Nagoya Main Line. The collision caused the train to derail and strike several concrete poles until it stopped after going . The car had lost a wheel while attempting to cross the tracks and therefore was unable to drive off the tracks.

References

External links

 Photos of aftermath of the derailment (photos 7-16) 
 Photos from the accident and of the trains involved 
 Photos of the train car which struck the car on the tracks 

Railway accidents and incidents in Japan
Railway accidents in 2002
Level crossing incidents in Asia